Katia is a feminine given name.

"Katia" may also refer to:

Katia, Benin, a village
Katia (film), a 1938 French drama starring Danielle Darrieux
Katia's Russian Tea Room, restaurant located in San Francisco, California specializing in Russian cuisine
Battle of Katia, a World War I battle
Hurricane Katia (2011)
Kátia (footballer), Kátia Cilene Teixeira da Silva, Brazilian footballer

See also 
 Catia (disambiguation)